In enzymology, a N-(long-chain-acyl)ethanolamine deacylase is an enzyme that catalyzes the chemical reaction

N-(long-chain-acyl)ethanolamine + H2O  a long-chain carboxylate + ethanolamine

Thus, the two substrates of this enzyme are N-(long-chain-acyl)ethanolamine and H2O, whereas its two products are long-chain carboxylate and ethanolamine.

This enzyme belongs to the family of hydrolases, those acting on carbon-nitrogen bonds other than peptide bonds, specifically in linear amides.  The systematic name of this enzyme class is N-(long-chain-acyl)ethanolamine amidohydrolase. Other names in common use include N-acylethanolamine amidohydrolase, and acylethanolamine amidase.

References

 

EC 3.5.1
Enzymes of unknown structure